Tikapur Great Garden (Tikapur Park) is a tourist attraction in Tikapur, Nepal. It is located on the shore of the Karnali River and serves people with the variety of flowers and trees. There is a boating facility on the river and a couple of beaches where people can swim or take a sun bath. In the past it is used to be a royal bungalow of late king Birendra.

Gallery

Buildings and structures in Kailali District
Gardens in Nepal